The DMC DeLorean is a rear-engine two-passenger sports car manufactured and marketed by John DeLorean's DeLorean Motor Company (DMC) for the American market from 1981 until 1983—ultimately the only car brought to market by the fledgling company. The DeLorean is sometimes referred to by its internal DMC pre-production designation, DMC-12. However, the DMC-12 name was never used in sales or marketing materials for the production model.

Designed by Giorgetto Giugiaro and noted for its gull-wing doors and brushed stainless-steel outer body panels, the sports car was also noted for a lack of power and performance incongruous with its looks and price. Though its production was short-lived, the DeLorean became widely known after it was featured as the time machine in the Back to the Future films.

With the first production car completed on January 21, 1981, the design incorporated numerous minor revisions to the hood, wheels and interior before production ended in late December 1982, shortly after DMC filed for bankruptcy and after total production reached about 9,000 units.

Despite the car having a reputation for poor build quality and an unsatisfactory driving experience, the DeLorean continues to have a strong following driven in part by the popularity of Back to the Future. 6,500 DeLoreans were estimated to still be on the road as of 2015.

History

When details surrounding the DeLorean were first announced in the mid-1970s, there were numerous plans and rumors that the DeLorean would have many advanced features, such as elastic reservoir moulding (ERM), a unit construction plastic chassis, a mid-engine layout, an airbag, 10-mph bumpers and ultrawide Pirelli P7 tires; none of these would materialize in the production vehicle.

Originally, the car was intended to have a centrally-mounted Wankel rotary engine. The engine selection was reconsidered when Comotor production ended and the favored engine became the Ford Cologne V6 engine.

Appearing in October 1976, the first prototype was completed by American automotive chief engineer William T. Collins, formerly chief engineer at Pontiac. The prototype was initially known as the DSV-1, or DeLorean Safety Vehicle. As development continued, the model was referred to as the DSV-12, before changing to DMC-12, the "12" deriving from the target list price of $12,000 upon release.

The Ford V6 engine would soon be abandoned in favor of the complete drivetrain from the Citroën CX 2000—deemed a more reliable choice. The  I4 engine from Citroën was ultimately deemed underpowered for the DeLorean. When Citroën learned of DMC plans to turbocharge the engine, Citroën suggested that DMC find another engine.
Eventually the fuel-injected V6 PRV engine (Peugeot-Renault-Volvo) was selected. As a result, the engine location had to be moved from the mid-engined location in Prototype 1 to a rear-engined location in Prototype 2, a configuration which would be retained in the production vehicle.

The chassis was initially planned to use elastic reservoir moulding (ERM), which would lighten the car and lower its production costs. DeLorean had purchased patent rights to the essentially untested ERM technology, and it was eventually found unsuitable.

Prototype 1's interior was significantly different from the production vehicle's. Prototype 1 had a prominent full-width knee bar, as it was intended to be a safety car. A medium brown leather covered the seats, but they were much flatter and did not have the comfort and support of the production seats. A black steering wheel with a fat center was intended to hold an airbag and the driver had a full set of Stewart-Warner gauges. A central warning system would check various fluid levels and even warn of low brake pad thickness though, even at this time, it was suspected that production cars would not have this feature.

These and other changes to the original concept led to considerable schedule pressures. The design was deemed to require almost complete re-engineering, which was turned over to English engineer Colin Chapman, founder of Lotus Cars. Chapman replaced most of the unproven material and manufacturing techniques with those then employed by Lotus, including a steel backbone chassis.

In order to train the workforce, a small number of pre-production DeLoreans were produced with fiberglass bodies and are referred to as "black cars" or mules. After several delays and cost overruns, production at the Dunmurry factory, located a few miles from Belfast City Centre, finally began in late 1980. Around this time DMC officially dropped the name DMC-12 on its now $25,000 car in favor of the model name DeLorean. The DeLorean sports car, as it was described in advertisements, began production in December 1980 with the first production car rolling off the assembly line on January 21, 1981.

The DeLorean Motor Company was placed into receivership in February 1982 and filed bankruptcy on October 26 of that year, just a few days after the arrest of its founder, John DeLorean, on drug trafficking charges. Consolidated International purchased the unsold DeLoreans and partially completed DeLoreans still on the assembly line and assembled approximately 100 cars to finish the remaining production on December 24, 1982.

Sales and production

Sales
Prior to the release of the DeLorean, there was a waiting list of eager buyers, many of whom paid over MSRP. However, that exuberance subsided very quickly and production output soon far exceeded sales volume. October 1981 was the highest month of sales for DMC with 720 vehicles sold but by December, the US was falling into recession and interest rates were rising which further negatively impacted sales. Despite this, instead of reducing production, John DeLorean doubled production output, further adding to the inventory of unsold cars. By the end of 1981, DMC had produced 7,500 cars but had sold only 3,000. By this point, DMC was in a financial hardship having sold only 350 units in January 1982 and in February of that year, DMC was placed into receivership.

In February 1982, unsold 1981 model year cars were “priced for immediate clearance” in hopes to make room for the more expensive 1982 model year cars. In March, telegrams were sent to all 343 dealerships requesting each buy six cars to help save the company; none of the dealers responded with a sales order. By this point, dealers were sitting on unsold inventory as were the quality assurance centers and hundreds more sitting on the docks in Long Beach, California. By the end of May 1982, production at the factory was shut down. Another attempt in July 1982 was made to revive sales by offering discounts to dealerships and offering a 5-year/ warranty with the first year or  portion secured by a major insurance carrier but this was not successful.

Bruce McWilliams, VP of Marketing for DMC and later acting President for DMC America, after resigning his position said, “The car could never be sold in the numbers John DeLorean predicted".

Production
Production information was lost or scattered upon the shutdown of DMC and production figures for the DeLorean have never been verified based on official factory records. Despite some unexplained VIN gaps, based upon VIN information, owners have been able to piece together the approximate quantity of DeLoreans produced.

In February 1982, DMC was placed into receivership and the factory continued to operate at a reduced production rate until the end of May. When Consolidated International acquired the unsold and partially assembled cars in November 1982, it brought back workers to complete the cars remaining on the assembly line. It was decided to make the remaining completed 1982 model year cars into 1983 models. The remaining cars' VINs were re-VINed into 1983 cars by taking the original VIN and adding 5000 to it and changing the "CD" in the middle of the VIN to "DD" thus making a 1983 model.  For the 1981 model year, there were 6,700 DeLoreans produced (VIN 500–7199). For the 1982 model year, there were 1,999 DeLoreans produced (VIN 10001–11999). For the 1983 model year, there were 276 DeLoreans (VIN 17000–17170 and 20001–20105) bringing the total estimated production to 8,975 cars.

Construction
The DeLorean features a number of unusual construction details, including gull-wing doors, unpainted stainless-steel body panels, and a rear-mounted engine.

Body

The body design of the DeLorean was a product of Giorgetto Giugiaro of Italdesign. To create the car, Giugiaro drew on one of his previous works, the Porsche Tapiro, a concept car from 1970. The body is paneled in brushed SS304 austenitic stainless steel, and except for three cars plated in 24-karat gold, all DeLoreans left the factory uncovered by paint or clearcoat. Painted DeLoreans do exist, although these were all painted after the cars were purchased from the factory.

Small scratches in the stainless-steel body panels can be removed with a non-metallic scouring pad (since metal pads can leave iron particles embedded in the stainless steel, which can give the appearance of the stainless "rusting"), or even sandpaper. The stainless-steel panels are fixed to a fiberglass underbody. The underbody is affixed to a steel double-Y frame chassis, inspired by the Lotus Esprit platform. The chassis was coated with epoxy, a material that protects steel against corrosion.

Another distinctive feature of the DeLorean is its gull-wing doors. The DeLorean features heavy doors supported by cryogenically preset torsion bars and nitrogen-charged struts. These torsion bars and struts were developed by American aircraft company Grumman Aerospace. The doors featured red and amber lights to mark their edges at night and small cutout windows, because full-sized windows would not be fully retractable within the short door panels. Although early-production cars had fitment problems due to faulty striker plates and issues with weather seals, these were tolerable because gull-wing doors allowed occupants to enter and exit the car in tight parking places as well as attracting attention from people nearby.

Engine and drivetrain

These PRVs were a development of the 2.7-litre V6 used in the Renault 30 that were designed and built under special contract with the DeLorean Motor Company.

This engine has a 90-degree layout with a light-alloy block with cast iron cylinder liners and light-alloy heads with cross-flow hemi-chambers. It is cooled by a front-mounted radiator with twin-thermostatically controlled electric cooling fans. The engine has a  bore and  stroke, a compression ratio of 8.8:1 and was fitted with a Bosch K-Jetronic fuel injection system.

Two transmissions were available for the DeLorean: a 5-speed manual and a 3-speed automatic, both with a final drive ratio of 3.44:1.

Suspension
The DeLorean has a four-wheel independent suspension with coil springs, and telescopic shock absorbers. The front suspension uses double wishbones, while the rear is a multi-link setup.

When the DeLorean first arrived in the US, the car had a higher-than-expected wheel gap in the front suspension.  Despite having significantly less weight in the front, the front and rear springs had the same spring rate and used lower-quality steel, which resulted in the nose-high look. Some people have cited a last-minute change in US bumper height requirements led DMC to raise the vehicle just prior to delivery; however, this is not true. Design drawings show that the design met NHTSA minimum bumper and headlight heights of the time.

Steering is rack and pinion, with an overall steering ratio of 14.9:1, giving 2.65 turns lock-to-lock and a  curb-to-curb turning circle. These were fitted with 195/60-14 (front) and 235/60-15 (rear) Goodyear NCT steel-belted radial tires. The DeLorean is a rear-engine vehicle with a 35%–65% front–rear weight distribution.

Reception

The automotive press was generally complimentary. Motor Trend, Car and Driver and Road & Track made generally positive remarks about the car, particularly its commendable fuel economy, and argued that the DeLorean is more of a GT car rather than a sports car or race car, given a disappointing performance in comparative tests.

Later reviews have been harsher. In 2017, Time included the DeLorean in its list of the 50 worst cars of all time. In his book Naff Motors: 101 Automotive Lemons, Tony Davis described the build quality as "woeful". Top Gear writer Richard Porter included it in his book Crap Cars, calling it "dismal".

Performance
DMC's comparison literature noted that the DeLorean could achieve  in 8.8 seconds when equipped with a manual transmission, but other sources indicate an acceleration time of 9.5 seconds. The car was described as "not quick for a sports/GT car in this price category" by Road & Track.

Quality problems
DeLoreans, early-production models in particular, suffered from poor build quality as well as mechanical issues. Early-production cars needed as much as 200 hours of work at DMC Quality Assurance Centers prior to being shipped to dealerships for delivery. DMC eventually sent 30 factory workers to the quality centers in the US to learn about the problems and how to fix them. Quality did improve over time, and by 1982 many of the quality issues had been resolved. A total of four recalls were issued by the factory to correct problems such as a sticking throttle, front-suspension issues and an inertia switch.

Other quality issues included other problems surrounding the front suspension, clutch pedal adjustment (or lack thereof), brake rotors, instruments, in particular the speedometer, power door locks and weak alternators. Many early DeLoreans were delivered poorly aligned, with the toe-in incorrectly set, leading to premature tire wear. In addition, many dealers were reluctant to perform warranty work on DeLoreans, since DMC owed them money for past warranty claims. Some dealerships were not able to perform repair work properly, as DMC never issued a proper service manual. The lack of quality service at dealerships was a point of frustration for many DeLorean owners at the time, particularly those who paid over sticker price to purchase one of the first cars.

Pricing and options

Base price

MSRP increased in 1982, to $29,825, and again in 1983, to $34,000, .

Options
A 3-speed automatic transmission, priced at $650 MSRP, was the only extra-cost factory option. Interior color choices were grey or black. The grey interior became available mid-1981 model year. The standard feature list included stainless-steel body panels, gull-wing doors with cryogenically treated torsion bars, 5-speed manual transmission, Bridge of Weir leather seats, air conditioning, AM/FM cassette stereo system, power windows, locks and mirrors, a tilt and telescopic steering wheel, tinted glass, body side moldings, intermittent windshield wipers, and electric rear-window defogger.

Several dealer options were available, including a car cover, sheepskin seat covers, floor mats, car care cleaning kit, black textured accent stripes, grey scotch-cal accent stripes, a luggage rack and a ski-rack adapter.

Production changes
Although there were no typical yearly updates to the DeLorean, several changes were made to the DeLorean during production. Instead of making changes at the end of the model year, DMC implemented changes mid-production. This resulted in no clear distinction between the 1981, 1982, and 1983 model years, but with subtle changes taking place almost continuously throughout the production run.

Hood styles
The original hood of the DeLorean had grooves running down both sides. It included a fuel filler flap to simplify fuel filling. These cars typically had a locking fuel cap to prevent fuel tampering or theft by siphoning. In August 1981, the fuel flap was removed from the hood (although the hood creases remained). After the supply of locking caps was exhausted, the company switched to a non-locking fuel cap (resulting in at least 500 cars with no hood flap, but with locking fuel caps). The final styling for the hood included the addition of a cast metal DeLorean emblem in the lower right corner and the removal of the grooves, resulting in a completely flat hood.  This final version was on all 1982–1983 model year vehicles.

Other changes
Closing the gull-wing door from the inside can be achieved by using a grab handle. For people with shorter arms, DMC installed leather pull straps attached to the grab handle.  Beginning with late-model 1981 cars, DMC revised the location of the leather pull strap to be centrally mounted and integrated into the lower door panel.

The rear trim panel has an armrest extension that is visibly two separate pieces on early 1981 models; this armrest has a tendency to break loose as people get in and out of the vehicle. In late 1981, this was resolved by having the armrest extension integrated into the rear trim panel, the assembly wrapped in vacuum-formed vinyl.

Although the styling of the DeLorean's wheels remained unchanged, the wheels of early 1981 models were painted grey. These wheels sported matching grey center caps with an embossed DMC logo. Early into the 1981 production run, these were changed to a polished silver look, with a contrasting black center cap. The embossed logo on the center caps was painted silver to add contrast.

In 1981, the DeLorean came with a Craig AM/FM stereo radio with cassette. Since the Craig radio did not have a built-in clock, one was installed in front of the gear shift on the console. The Craig radio was replaced with an ASI radio in the middle of the 1982 production run. Since the ASI radio featured an on-board clock, the clock on the console was removed at the same time.

The first 2,200 cars produced used a windshield-embedded antenna. This type of antenna proved to be unsuitable with poor radio reception. Oftentimes the radio would continually "seek", attempting to find a signal. A standard whip antenna, which was later changed to a manually retractable antenna, was added to the outside of the front right fender. Despite improving radio reception, this resulted in a hole in the stainless steel, and an unsightly antenna. As a result, the antenna was again moved. The final antenna was an automatic retractable version installed under the rear induction grill behind the rear driver's-side window.

The small sun visors on the DeLorean have vinyl on one side and headliner fabric on the other side. Originally these were installed such that the headliner side would be on the bottom when not in use. Later on in 1981, they were reversed so that the vinyl side would be on the bottom.

The original 80-amp Ducellier alternator supplied with the early-production DeLoreans could not provide enough current to supply the car when all lights and electrical options were on; as a result, the battery would gradually discharge, leaving the driver stranded on the road.  This happened to DeLorean owner Johnny Carson shortly after he was presented with the vehicle. Beginning with cars built in late 1981, DeLoreans were fitted from the factory with a 90-amp Motorola alternator, which solved this problem.

Notable and unique exemplars

Wooden mock-up

In March 1975, DMC entered into a contract with Italdesign to have Giorgetto Giugiaro design the DeLorean sports car. John DeLorean and Bill Collins approved one of the many designs, and the styling mock-up that was made from "epo-wood" (wooden framework with a special epoxy plaster) was shipped to the DMC office in Michigan on July 31, 1975. This mock-up served as the template for the prototype. The original full-size epo-wood DeLorean styling model was modified in the first quarter 1979 to reflect the refreshed design used in production.

The mock-up was donated to the Ulster Folk and Transport Museum, in Cultra, County Down (Northern Ireland), where it is now on display.

Prototypes and pilot cars
Only one of two DeLorean prototypes still exists. Prototype 1 was sold at the bankruptcy auction in 1984 for $37,000. The car remained in a private collection until 2005 when it was sold, received a complete restoration and is now on display at the AACA Museum in Hershey, Pennsylvania.

Prototype 2 was sent to Lotus Cars for development and evaluation in 1978. It was reported to have been destroyed in the 1990s.

An estimated 28 pilot cars were built. The pilot cars are best identified by the subtly different interiors and sliding side windows. These cars, used for evaluation and regulatory testing of the DeLorean were previously thought to have been destroyed. However, a few of the pilot cars have survived and are owned by private parties.

Visioneering car
With the 1980 NADA meeting approaching, DMC planned to show a final production version of the DeLorean; however, there were no production cars ready at the time or even any production stainless steel panels.  Earlier, in summer 1979, the revised Giugiaro styling mock-up was shipped to Visioneering, a Detroit based company, to create data needed to make the stamping dies for the stainless panels. This project expanded to create dies used to create a "production" car for the NADA show. Using a prototype chassis supplied by Lotus in late 1979, Visioneering completed the assembly of this car at a cost of $750,000. The car was presented at the 1980 NADA show and was later used for engineering development and technical training as well as press photos. The Visioneering car eventually was sold at the bankruptcy auction in late 1984 for $21,000. The car is in a private collection.

Legend turbo cars

It was determined that the DeLorean needed additional power when automotive magazine road tests showed  times for the DeLorean between 9.5 and 10.5 seconds, while its rivals were in the 7.5–8.5 seconds range. There had been interest in turbocharging the DeLorean early on, but the DMC engineering staff was busy with other projects, so DMC decided to go outside to develop a turbocharged version.

DMC entered into a contract with Legend Industries, based in Hauppauge, New York, a firm having previous success with turbocharging Fiat Spiders for Fiat USA. DMC wanted to increase power without sacrificing fuel efficiency. DMC wanted a wide power band and did not want a surge of power similar to the Porsche 930 Turbo. Legend used twin IHI RHB52 turbos along with twin intercoolers. The results were an engine capable of accelerating smoothly in fifth gear from 1,500 rpm to full turbo boost at 2,500 rpm, reaching  at 6,500 rpm.

Legend converted four DeLoreans (two twin-turbo cars (VIN 502 and VIN 530) and two single-turbo cars (VIN 528 and VIN 558)). In a test run at Bridgehampton Raceway in 1981, the twin-turbo DeLorean was quicker than a Ferrari 308 and a Porsche 928. John DeLorean was so impressed with the engine, he committed to ordering 5,000 engines from Legend Industries. DMC planned to offer a turbocharged engine as a $7,500 option in 1984. Before any of the 5,000 cars could be put into production, DMC had declared bankruptcy, which drove Legend Industries, as well as other suppliers, into bankruptcy.

Gold-plated

For Christmas 1980, a DeLorean/American Express promotion planned to sell 100 24K-gold-plated DeLoreans for US$85,000 each to its gold-card members, but only two were sold. The first gold-plated American Express DeLorean was purchased by Sherwood Marshall, an entrepreneur and former Royal Canadian Naval Officer. This car, VIN 4300, is equipped with a manual transmission and a saddle-brown interior. Marshall donated his DeLorean to the William F. Harrah Foundation/National Automobile Museum in Reno, Nevada.

The second gold-plated DeLorean was purchased by Roger Mize, president of Snyder National Bank in Snyder, Texas. This car, VIN 4301, equipped with an automatic transmission and black interior, sat in the bank lobby for over 20 years before being loaned to the Petersen Automotive Museum in Los Angeles.

A third gold-plated car was assembled with spare parts that were required by American Express in case one of the other two that were built was damaged. All necessary gold-plated parts were on hand, with the exception of one door that was sourced later. The car was first acquired by the winner of a Big Lots store raffle. This car, VIN 20105, is in a private collection.

Two other privately-commissioned gold-plated DeLoreans exist (one being VIN 1542) but their whereabouts are unknown.

Right-hand-drive models

DeLoreans were primarily intended for the American market. All production models were therefore left-hand-drive. DMC was aware as early as April 1981 of the need to produce a right-hand-drive (RHD) version to supply to world markets, specifically the United Kingdom. DMC faced the choice of building right-hand-drive models from scratch or performing a post-production conversion. Given the cost of new body molds, tooling, and a host of specific parts that a factory-built right-hand-drive configuration would require, the company opted to investigate the idea of a post-production conversion using Wooler-Hodec, an English company based in Andover, Hampshire.  About 30 early DeLoreans were shipped to Wooler-Hodec and the best 20 were to be converted to RHD. However, only 13 were completed before DMCL went into receivership which subsequently led to the closure of Wooler-Hodec.

Three other factory-authorized RHD cars were built. Known as AXI cars, these cars were registered and used by the factory in Northern Ireland, with registration numbers (license plates), AXI 1697, AXI 1698, AXI 1699 and have minor differences from the Wooler-Hodec cars.

After the liquidation of DMC, many of the factory company cars were sold at various auctions around the UK, some of which were converted by former Wooler-Hodec employees and DMCL engineers to RHD resulting in eight known post-factory RHD conversions.

Back to the Future

The DMC DeLorean is most notably featured as the time machine in the Back to the Future film trilogy. Six DeLoreans were used during the production, along with one manufactured out of fiberglass for scenes where a full-size DeLorean was needed to "fly" on-screen. The cars used in the first film had the original V6 engine (whose sound in the movie comes from the V8 engine of a Porsche 928). Two of the cars used in Back to the Future Part III were equipped with Volkswagen engines and dune buggy chassis for filming the scenes in the Western terrain.

Only three of the cars still exist, with one that was destroyed at the end of Part III, two additional cars were abandoned, and the fiberglass replica used in Part II was scrapped. Universal Studios owns two of the remaining cars, occasionally putting them on display or using them for other productions. The third car, used in Back to the Future Part III, was restored and was sold at auction for $541,200 in December 2011. A fully restored Back to the Future DeLorean can be viewed at the Petersen Automotive Museum in Los Angeles.

New production
In 1995, Stephen Wynne, a British car mechanic from Liverpool, created a separate company based in the north Houston suburb of Humble, Texas, using the DeLorean Motor Company name. Wynne acquired the trademark on the stylized DMC logo, along with the remaining parts inventory of the original DeLorean Motor Company.

After the passage of the Low Volume Vehicle Manufacturing Act, DMC Texas announced that it planned to produce replica DeLoreans. However, due to delays by the NHTSA in ratifying the act, the plan to build modernized DeLoreans was canceled.  There has been discussion about DMC Texas building an upgraded version of the original DeLorean to mark the 40th anniversary, but no details have been released.

Notes

References

Bibliography

Further reading

External links

 DeLorean Motor Company
 DeLorean Museum
 
 
 1976 Concept DeLorean DMC 12
 The Car's the Star – TV biography of the DMC by former Top Gear host Quentin Willson (1999, UK)

Cars of Northern Ireland
Sports cars
Rear-engined vehicles
Back to the Future (franchise)
Cars introduced in 1981
Automobiles with gull-wing doors
Coupés
First car made by manufacturer
Automobiles with backbone chassis
Cars powered by rear-mounted 6-cylinder engines
Italdesign vehicles
Cars discontinued in 1983